Calliope Mountain is a  mountain summit located in the Chugach Mountains, in Anchorage Municipality in the U.S. state of Alaska. The first ascent of the peak was made June 24, 1967, by W.E. Hauser and B.P. Hansen, who proposed naming it "Icy Peak", but their fellow members at the Mountaineering Club of Alaska persuaded them to adopt a more distinctive name that would be in keeping with the music theme of the immediate area. Within three miles of the peak there is a Symphony Lake, Concerto Peak, Flute Peak, Triangle Peak, Organ Mountain, Cantata Peak, and Hurdygurdy Mountain. The mountain's calliope name was officially adopted in 1969 by the U.S. Board on Geographic Names.

Climate

Based on the Köppen climate classification, Calliope Mountain is located in a subarctic climate with cold, snowy winters, and mild summers. Temperatures can drop below −20 °C with wind chill factors below −30 °C. This climate supports two small unnamed glaciers on the north slope, and the Flute and Organ Glaciers to the east. The months May through June offer the most favorable weather for climbing or viewing this mountain. Precipitation runoff from the peak drains into tributaries of Eagle River.

See also

List of mountain peaks of Alaska
Geography of Alaska

References

External links
 Weather forecast: Calliope Mountain

Mountains of Alaska
Mountains of Anchorage, Alaska
North American 2000 m summits